Raktanchal is a Hindi-language crime drama web series directed by Ritam Srivastav for MX Player original. The story of the web-series is inspired by real-life events from the 1980s of two notable mafias Purvanchal, a region in east Uttar Pradesh. The series stars Kranti Prakash Jha and Nikitin Dheer along with Chittaranjan Tripathy, Vikram Kochhar, Pramod Pathak, Soundarya Sharma, Ronjini Chakraborty and Daya Shankar Pandey.

It is written by Sarvesh Upadhyay  and produced by chitra vakil sharma , chandni soni , Pradeep Gupta, Shashank Raai, Mahima Gupta under the banner of Pinaka Studios Pvt Ltd and Mahima Productions. The series was premiered on May 28, 2020 on OTT platform MX Player. Kranti Prakash Jha has said that there will be a second season.  Second season of the series  was premiered on February 11, 2022 on OTT platform MX Player.  Second Season is produced by Arjun Singhh Baran & Kartk D Nishandar under the banner of Gseams.

Plot 
Raktanchal is set in the 1980s of Purvanchal and is inspired by the true events. It is the story of Waseem Khan (played by Nikitin Dheer) who rules the tender mafia in Purvanchal, Uttar Pradesh, who is also involved in the smuggling of arms and ammunition. The story revolves around Vijay Singh (played by Kranti Prakash Jha) and Waseem Khan, who are constantly at loggerheads and leading to a series of bloodbaths.

Khan is challenged by the antihero Vijay Singh, who held high morals and wanted to become a civil servant until Khan's gang murdered his father Virendra Singh (played by Gyan Prakash). While Vijay is determined to take revenge of his father's murder, who was killed by Waseem's company, while Waseem is determined to hold on to his power come what may.

Cast 
 Nikitin Dheer as Waseem Khan
 Kranti Prakash Jha as Vijay Singh
 Soundarya Sharma as Roli
 Ronjini Chakraborty as Seema
 Chittaranjan Tripathy as Bechan
 Ashish Vidyarthi as Ramanand Rai
 Pramod Pathak as Tripurari
 Vikram Kochhar as Sanki Pandey
 Krishna Bisht as Katta
 Basu Soni as Chhunnu
 Rajesh Dubey as Sadhu Maharaj
 Kenisha Awasthi as Bindu
 Shashi Chaturvedi as Bilal
 Pravina Bhagwat Deshpande as Sudha (Vijay's mother)
 Ravi Khanvilkar as Pujari Singh
 Prachi Prakash Kurne as Badki
 Farah Malik as Fazila
 Daya Shankar Pandey as Sahib Singh
 Bhupesh Singh as Irshad
 Sushil Kr. Srivastav as Hifazat
 Gyan Prakash as Virendra Singh (Vijay's father)
 Gurpreet Bedi as Fazila Khan

Marketing and release 
The web series's official trailer was launched on May 24, 2020 by MX Player on YouTube.

Reception 
The series received positive reviews from critics, who praised its performances. Ronak Kotecha, editor-in-chief of The Times of India gave three-and-a-half of five stating , "With powerful performances and bloody face-offs, Raktanchal has enough ammo to keep you engaged through all nine episodes."

Ruchi Kaushal of Hindustan Times said, "In this world where an eye for an eye has been making the whole world blind, stirring performances are the key. Kranti Prakash Jha plays his part well as a lanky gang leader and carries Raktanchal on his shoulder. His character reminded me of Jimmy Sheirgill's Rangbaaz Phirse for its IAS-aspirant- turned gangster story. While Jimmy's charm worked wonders in that show, Kranti also does justice to his role. Besides him, Vikram Kocchhar is one actor who brings a smile with his twisted portrayal of coal mafia."

Scroll.in's chief editor Nandini Ramanath reviewed "The leads are well cast, with each playing to their strengths.". Prathyush Parasuraman writing for Film Companion gave a mixed review and said "there is a lot of violence. And to be honest, I am quite tired of it."

In August 2020, Raktanchal crossed 100 million views on MX Player. In October 2020, Raktanchal was included in the list of Best series on MX Player, released by Indian Express.

References

External links 
 

2020 Indian television series debuts
MX Player original programming
Hindi-language web series
Indian web series
Indian action television series
Television shows set in Uttar Pradesh
Indian crime television series
Television series about organized crime
Works about organised crime in India